The Purdue Boilermakers baseball team is a baseball team that represents Purdue University in the 2023 NCAA Division I baseball season. The Boilermakers are members of the Big Ten Conference and play their home games at Alexander Field in West Lafayette, Indiana. They are led by fourth-year head coach Greg Goff.

Previous season
The Boilermakers finished the 2022 NCAA Division I baseball season 29–21 overall (9–12 conference) and seventh place in the conference standings, qualifying for the 2022 Big Ten Conference Baseball Tournament, where they were eliminated after going 0–2.

Preseason
Following the season, Daniel Furuto left to take a position with Abilene Christian, but Purdue did not replace him.

Roster

Schedule

! style="" | Regular Season
|- valign="top"

|- align="center" bgcolor="#ccffcc"
| 1 || February 17 || || vs  || Constellation Field • Sugar Land, Texas || 12–1 || Stephen (1–0) || Chudy (0–1) || None || 188 || 1–0 || –
|- align="center" bgcolor="#ccffcc"
| 2 || February 18 || || vs Holy Cross || Constellation Field • Sugar Land, Texas || 14–4 || Suval (1–0) || DiLauro (0–1) || None || 275 || 2–0 || –
|- align="center" bgcolor="#ffcccc"
| 3 || February 18 || || vs Holy Cross || Constellation Fieldx • Sugar Land, Texas || 3–12 || Fox (1–0) || Backer (0–1) || Macchiarola (1) || 275 || 2–1 || –
|- align="center" bgcolor="#ccffcc"
| 4 || February 19 || || vs Holy Cross || Constellation Field • Sugar Land, Texas || 12–2 || Blackwell (1–0) || Wywoda (0–1) || None || 236 || 3–1 || –
|- align="center" bgcolor="#ccffcc"
| 5 || February 24 || || vs  || Ting Stadium • Holly Springs, North Carolina || 6–5 || Suval (2–0) || Reiner (0–1) || None || 755 || 4–1 || –
|- align="center" bgcolor="#ffcccc"
| 6 || February 24 || || vs NJIT || Ting Stadium • Holly Springs, North Carolina || 1–5 || Kidd (2–0) || Backer (0–2) || de Jong (1) || 755 || 4–2 || –
|- align="center" bgcolor="#ccffcc"
| 7 || February 25 || || vs NJIT || Ting Stadium • Holly Springs, North Carolina || 7–4 || Dannelley (1–0) || Cirone (0–1) || Suval (1) || 133 || 5–2 || –
|- align="center" bgcolor="#ffcccc"
| 8 || February 29 || || vs NJIT || Ting Stadium • Holly Springs, North Carolina || 5–7 || Georgini (2–2) || Schapira (0–1) || None || 478 || 5–3 || –
|-

|- align="center" bgcolor="#ffcccc"
| 9 || March 3 || || vs  || Ting Stadium • Holly Springs, North Carolina || 1–2 || Tortorella (1–1) || Lambert (0–1) || Gillies (1) || 266 || 5–4 || –
|- align="center" bgcolor="#ccffcc"
| 10 || March 4 || || vs Akron || Ting Stadium • Holly Springs, North Carolina || 17–9 || Blackwell (2–0) || Atkins (0–2) || None || 554 || 6–4 || –
|- align="center" bgcolor="#ccffcc"
| 11 || March 4 || || vs Akron || Ting Stadium • Holly Springs, North Carolina || 13–0 || Iwinski (1–0) || Pirkle (0–1) || None || 554 || 7–4 || –
|- align="center" bgcolor="#ccffcc"
| 12 || March 5 || || vs Akron || Ting Stadium • Holly Springs, North Carolina|| 23–4 || Schapira (1–1) || Roth (0–2) || None || 335 || 8–4 || –
|- align="center" bgcolor="#ffcccc"
| 13 || March 10 || || at #4  || Swayze Field • Oxford, Mississippi || 7–15 || Dougherty (2–1) || Stephen (1–1) || None || 10,337 || 8–5 || –
|- align="center" bgcolor="#ffcccc"
| 14 || March 11 || || at #4 Ole Miss || Swayze Field • Oxford, Mississippi || 6–7 || Nichols (1–0) || Dannelley (1–1) || None || 9,991 || 8–6 || –
|- align="center" bgcolor="#ffcccc"
| 15 || March 12 || || at #4 Ole Miss || Swayze Field • Oxford, Mississippi || 1–6 || Rivas (4–0) || Iwinski (1–1) || None || 9,377 || 8–7 || –
|- align="center" bgcolor=
| 16 || March 15 || ||  || Alexander Field • West Lafayette, Indiana || – || – || – || – || – || – || –
|- align="center" bgcolor=
| 17 || March 17 || || at  || Charles H. Braun Stadium • Evansville, Indiana || – || – || – || – || – || – || –
|- align="center" bgcolor=
| 18 || March 18 || || at Evansville || Charles H. Braun Stadium • Evansville, Indiana || – || – || – || – || – || – || –
|- align="center" bgcolor=
| 19 || March 19 || || at Evansville || Charles H. Braun Stadium • Evansville, Indiana || – || – || – || – || – || – || –
|- align="center" bgcolor=
| 20 || March 21 || ||  || Alexander Field • West Lafayette, Indiana || – || – || – || – || – || – || –
|- align="center" bgcolor=
| 21 || March 24 || || at Michigan State || Drayton McLane Baseball Stadium at John H. Kobs Field • East Lansing, Michigan || – || – || – || – || – || – || –
|- align="center" bgcolor=
| 22 || March 23 || || at Michigan State || Drayton McLane Baseball Stadium at John H. Kobs Field • East Lansing, Michigan || – || – || – || – || – || – || –
|- align="center" bgcolor=
| 23 || March 24 || || at Michigan State || Drayton McLane Baseball Stadium at John H. Kobs Field • East Lansing, Michigan || – || – || – || – || – || – || –
|- align="center" bgcolor=
| 24 || March 28 || || at  || Bob Warn Field at Sycamore Stadium • Terre Haute, Indiana || – || – || – || – || – || – || –
|- align="center" bgcolor=
| 25 || March 31 || ||  || Alexander Field • West Lafayette, Indiana || – || – || – || – || – || – || –
|-

|- align="center" bgcolor=
| 26 || April 1 || || Northwestern || Alexander Field • West Lafayette, Indiana || – || – || – || – || – || – || –
|- align="center" bgcolor=
| 27 || April 2 || || Northwestern || Alexander Field • West Lafayette, Indiana || – || – || – || – || – || – || –
|- align="center" bgcolor=
| 28 || April 4 || || Evansville || Alexander Field • West Lafayette, Indiana || – || – || – || – || – || – || –
|- align="center" bgcolor=
| 29 || April 7 || || at  || Siebert Field • Minneapolis, Minnesota || – || – || – || – || – || – || –
|- align="center" bgcolor=
| 30 || April 8 || || at Minnesota || Siebert Field • Minneapolis, Minnesota || – || – || – || – || – || – || –
|- align="center" bgcolor=
| 31 || April 9 || || at Minnesota || Siebert Field • Minneapolis, Minnesota || – || – || – || – || – || – || –
|- align="center" bgcolor=
| 32 || April 11 || || Indiana State || Alexander Field • West Lafayette, Indiana || – || – || – || – || – || – || –
|- align="center" bgcolor=
| 33 || April 14 || ||  || Alexander Field • West Lafayette, Indiana || – || – || – || – || – || – || –
|- align="center" bgcolor=
| 34 || April 15 || || Penn State || Alexander Field • West Lafayette, Indiana || – || – || – || – || – || – || –
|- align="center" bgcolor=
| 35 || April 16 || || Penn State || Alexander Field • West Lafayette, Indiana || – || – || – || – || – || – || –
|- align="center" bgcolor=
| 36 || April 18 || ||  || Alexander Field • West Lafayette, Indiana || – || – || – || – || – || – || –
|- align="center" bgcolor=
| 37 || April 19 || ||  || Alexander Field • West Lafayette, Indiana || – || – || – || – || – || – || –
|- align="center" bgcolor=
| 38 || April 21 || || at  || Bob "Turtle" Smith Stadium • College Park, Maryland || – || – || – || – || – || – || –
|- align="center" bgcolor=
| 39 || April 22 || || at Maryland || Bob "Turtle" Smith Stadium • College Park, Maryland || – || – || – || – || – || – || –
|- align="center" bgcolor=
| 40 || April 23 || || at Maryland || Bob "Turtle" Smith Stadium • College Park, Maryland || – || – || – || – || – || – || –
|- align="center" bgcolor=
| 41 || April 25 || ||  || Alexander Field • West Lafayette, Indiana || – || – || – || – || – || – || –
|- align="center" bgcolor=
| 42 || April 26 || ||  || Alexander Field • West Lafayette, Indiana || – || – || – || – || – || – || –
|- align="center" bgcolor=
| 43 || April 28 || ||  || Alexander Field • West Lafayette, Indiana || – || – || – || – || – || – || –
|- align="center" bgcolor=
| 44 || April 29 || || Rutgers || Alexander Field • West Lafayette, Indiana || – || – || – || – || – || – || –
|- align="center" bgcolor=
| 45 || April 30 || || Rutgers || Alexander Field • West Lafayette, Indiana || – || – || – || – || – || – || –
|-

|- align="center" bgcolor=
| 46 || May 5 || ||  || Alexander Field • West Lafayette, Indiana || – || – || – || – || – || – || –
|- align="center" bgcolor=
| 47 || May 6 || || South Dakota State || Alexander Field • West Lafayette, Indiana || – || – || – || – || – || – || –
|- align="center" bgcolor=
| 48 || May 7 || || South Dakota State || Alexander Field • West Lafayette, Indiana || – || – || – || – || – || – || –
|- align="center" bgcolor=
| 49 || May 8 || || South Dakota State || Alexander Field • West Lafayette, Indiana || – || – || – || – || – || – || –
|- align="center" bgcolor=
| 50 || May 10 || || at UIC || Les Miller Field at Curtis Granderson Stadium • Chicago, Illinois || – || – || – || – || – || – || –
|- align="center" bgcolor=
| 51 || May 12 || || at  || Bart Kaufman Field • Bloomington, Indiana || – || – || – || – || – || – || –
|- align="center" bgcolor=
| 52 || May 13 || || at Indiana || Bart Kaufman Field • Bloomington, Indiana || – || – || – || – || – || – || –
|- align="center" bgcolor=
| 53 || May 14 || || at Indiana || Bart Kaufman Field • Bloomington, Indiana || – || – || – || – || – || – || –
|- align="center" bgcolor=
| 54 || May 18 || ||  || Alexander Field • West Lafayette, Indiana || – || – || – || – || – || – || –
|- align="center" bgcolor=
| 55 || May 19 || || Nebraska || Alexander Field • West Lafayette, Indiana || – || – || – || – || – || – || –
|- align="center" bgcolor=
| 56 || May 20 || || Nebraska || Alexander Field • West Lafayette, Indiana || – || – || – || – || – || – || –
|}
</div></div>
|}

References

Purdue
Purdue Boilermakers baseball seasons
Purdue